24th Division may refer to:

Infantry divisions 
24th Infantry Division (Bangladesh)
24th Division (German Empire)
24th Reserve Division (German Empire)
24th Infantry Division (Wehrmacht)
24th Waffen Mountain Division of the SS Karstjäger
24th Division (Imperial Japanese Army)
24th Infantry Division (Poland)
24th Infantry Division (Russian Empire)
24th Rifle Division (Soviet Union), now a Ukrainian Ground Forces brigade
24th Division (Spain)
24th Infantry Division (Syrian rebel group)
24th Division (United Kingdom)
24th Infantry Division (United States)

Cavalry divisions 
24th Cavalry Division (Soviet Union)
24th Cavalry Division (United States)

Armoured divisions 
24th Panzer Division (Wehrmacht)

Aviation divisions 
24th Fighter Division (China)
24th Air Division, United States

Other divisions 
 24th Submarine Division, part of the Northern Fleet, Soviet Union and Russia

See also 
24th Brigade (disambiguation)